Gianmarco Gambetta Sponza (born 2 May 1991) is a Peruvian/Italian footballer who plays as a center-back for Alianza Universidad.

References

External links

 

1991 births
Living people
Footballers from Lima
Peruvian footballers
Peru international footballers
Association football defenders
Club Deportivo Universidad de San Martín de Porres players
Argentinos Juniors footballers
FBC Melgar footballers
Juan Aurich footballers
Club Alianza Lima footballers
Argentine Primera División players
Peruvian expatriate footballers
Expatriate footballers in Argentina